"Keep This Fire Burning" is a song by Swedish recording artist Robyn, released as the first single from her third album Don't Stop the Music. The single was released in Sweden on 21 September 2002, where it became her highest charting single since 1995's "Do You Really Want Me (Show Respect)". The song was also released as a single in Australia under the name "By Your Side" due to the Australian bushfires which were happening at the time. In 2008, a re-recorded version of the song appeared on the special edition of Robyn's eponymous album.

British soul singer Beverley Knight released a cover of the song in 2004.

Track listings
CD single
 "Keep This Fire Burning" (Radio Original) – 3:52
 "Keep This Fire Burning" (Instrumental) – 3:52
 
CD maxi single and Australian CD single
 "Keep This Fire Burning" (Radio Original) – 3:52
 "Keep This Fire Burning" (Cherno Jah Remix) – 4:12
 "Keep This Fire Burning" (Martin Landquist 2002 Remix) – 4:16
 "Keep This Fire Burning" (Twin 12" Club Mix) – 7:24
 "Keep This Fire Burning" (Ingrosso & Father Remix) – 7:18
 "Keep This Fire Burning" (DJ Benji Remix) – 5:51

Personnel
 Written by Robyn, Remee, Ulf Lindström, Johan Ekhé
 Produced, arranged, recorded, mixed and instruments performed by Ghost

Charts

Weekly charts

Year-end charts

Beverley Knight version

British soul singer Beverley Knight recorded a cover version of "Keep This Fire Burning" and released it as the third and final single from her fourth studio album, Affirmation (2004), on 14 March 2005. The production of the song, handled by Ghost, used the exact same instrumental as Robyn's original version, with slight mixing differences and additional orchestration by the Stockholm Session Strings. Included on the CD single release were mixes from Stargate (which sampled a portion of Robyn's original vocals) and Full Phat (featuring a rap from Estelle). "Keep This Fire Burning" became Knight's sixth top-20 solo single in the UK, reaching number 16.

Track listings
 CD1
 "Keep This Fire Burning" (Album Version)
 "Keep This Fire Burning" (Full Phatt Mix) (Feat. Estelle)

 CD2
 "Keep This Fire Burning" (Album Version)
 "Keep This Fire Burning" (Boris Dlugosch & Michi Lange Club Mix)
 "I Was Meant for You"
 "Soon Come"
 "Keep This Fire Burning" (Music Video)

 12-inch vinyl
 "Keep This Fire Burning" (Album Version)
 "Keep This Fire Burning" (Boris Dlugosch & Michi Lange Dub Mix)
 "Keep This Fire Burning" (Full Phatt Mix) (Feat. Estelle)
 "Keep This Fire Burning" (Stargate Club Mix)

Personnel
 Written by Robyn, Remee, Ulf Lindström, Johan Ekhé
 Produced, arranged, recorded and mixed by Ghost
 All vocals by Beverley Knight
 String arrangement by Per Ekdahl
 Strings performed by Stockholm Session Strings at Cosmos Studios, Stockholm
 All other instruments by Ghost

Charts

Other versions
In 2008, British dance act Outsiders released a dance cover of the song with vocals by Amanda Wilson. The track was then remixed by Wawa and then again by Freemasons, who also collaborated with Wilson on various tracks such as "Watchin'". This version peaked at #80 in the UK.

References

External links
 Robyn's 
 Beverley Knight's 
 Outsiders's 

2002 singles
2005 singles
Beverley Knight songs
Robyn songs
Songs written by Remee
Songs written by Johan Ekhé
Songs written by Ulf Lindström
2002 songs
Song recordings produced by Ghost (production team)
Songs written by Robyn